The Enforcement Act of 1871, also known as the Ku Klux Klan Act, Third Enforcement Act, Third Ku Klux Klan Act, Civil Rights Act of 1871, or Force Act of 1871, is an Act of the United States Congress which empowered the President to suspend the writ of habeas corpus to combat the Ku Klux Klan (KKK) and other terrorist organizations. The act was passed by the 42nd United States Congress and signed into law by United States President Ulysses S. Grant on April 20, 1871. The act was the last of three Enforcement Acts passed by the United States Congress from 1870 to 1871 during the Reconstruction Era to combat attacks upon the suffrage rights of African Americans. The statute has been subject to only minor changes since then, but has been the subject of voluminous interpretation by courts.

This legislation was asked for by President Grant and passed within one month of when he sent the request to Congress. Grant's request was a result of the reports he was receiving of widespread racial threats in the Deep South, particularly in South Carolina. He felt that he needed to have his authority broadened before he could effectively intervene. After the act's passage, the president had the power for the first time to both suppress state disorders on his own initiative and to suspend the writ of habeas corpus. Grant did not hesitate to use this authority on numerous occasions during his presidency, and as a result the KKK was completely dismantled (ending the "first Klan" era) and did not resurface in any meaningful way until the beginning of the 20th century.

Several of the act's provisions still exist today as codified statutes. The most important of these is : Civil action for deprivation of rights. It is the most widely used civil rights enforcement statute, allowing people to sue in civil court over civil rights violations.

History

In response to political violence by the Ku Klux Klan and others during the Reconstruction era following the American Civil War, Congress passed three Enforcement Acts giving the federal government broader powers to guarantee citizens' constitutional rights. The third of these acts, enacted in April 1871, gave the president the power to imprison people without a trial (known as suspending the writ of habeas corpus) and to use the federal military on domestic soil to enforce constitutional rights, among other measures.

In January 1871, Republican Senator John Scott of Pennsylvania convened a congressional committee to hear testimony from witnesses of Klan atrocities. In February, Republican Congressman Benjamin Franklin Butler of Massachusetts introduced his anti-Klan bill, intended to enforce both the Fourteenth Amendment and the Civil Rights Act of 1866. Butler's bill was narrowly defeated in the House, whereupon Republican Rep. Samuel Shellabarger, of Ohio, introduced a substitute bill, only slightly less sweeping than Butler's original. This bill brought a few holdout Republicans into line, and the bill narrowly passed the House, sailed through the Senate, and was signed into law on April 20 by President Grant.

Use during Reconstruction
After the Civil War, President Ulysses S. Grant conducted an aggressive—and ultimately successful—campaign against the Ku Klux Klan and its offshoots (such as the Knights of the White Camellia) from the 1860s to the 1870s. Grant deployed federal soldiers to arrest Klan members, enlisted U.S. attorneys to try their cases, supported Congressional legislation like the Ku Klux Klan Act, and organized federal judges to oversee Klan trials. Under the Klan Act during Reconstruction, federal troops, rather than state militias, were used to enforce the law, and Klansmen were prosecuted in federal court, where juries were sometimes predominantly black. Hundreds of Klan members were fined or imprisoned, and habeas corpus was suspended in nine counties in South Carolina. These efforts were so successful that the Klan was destroyed in South Carolina and decimated throughout the rest of the former Confederacy, where it had already been in decline for several years. The Klan was not to exist again until its renewal in 1915. During its brief existence, however, the "first era" Klan did achieve many of its goals in the South, such as denying voting rights to Southern blacks.

In its early history, under the Grant Administration, this act was used, along with the Force Act, to bring to justice those who were violating the Civil Rights of newly freed African Americans. After the end of the Grant Administration, and the dismantling of Reconstruction under Rutherford B. Hayes, enforcement of the Act fell into disuse and few cases were brought under the statute for almost a hundred years.

Use during and after presidency of Donald Trump
In December 2020, the NAACP along with the Michigan Welfare Rights Organization and a group of Detroit voters sued U.S. President Donald Trump along with his presidential campaign and the Republican National Committee under the act as well as the Voting Rights Act. According to the lawsuit, President Trump and the Republican Party "coordinated conspiracy to disenfranchise Black voters" through legal actions intended to overturn the results of the 2020 presidential election in Michigan, Georgia and Pennsylvania via "intimidation and coercion of election officials and volunteers".

In February 2021, the NAACP and law firm Cohen Milstein filed another lawsuit invoking the act on behalf of U.S. Representative Bennie Thompson. Other congresspersons were to join the litigation as plaintiffs. The February suit was filed against former President Donald Trump, Rudy Giuliani, the Proud Boys, and the Oath Keepers. It alleges violations of the act pertaining to attempts to reject certification of the election results during the 2021 United States Electoral College vote count, as well as alleging conspiracy to incite violence leading to the 2021 United States Capitol attack. Following lawsuits filed by Thompson and Swalwell, the Lawyers' Committee for Civil Rights Under Law filed its complaint on behalf of seven officers working with United States Capitol Police accusing Trump, Roger Stone, Proud Boys, Stop the Steal, Oath Keepers and other persons who conspired to attack the Capitol under the same act and the D.C. Bias-Related Crimes Act.  On February 2, 2022, Vindman sued several Trump allies, alleging that they intimidated and retaliated against him while he testified in Congress, and thereby violated the Ku Klux Klan Act of 1871. The defendants in the lawsuit are Donald Trump Jr., Rudy Giuliani, former White House deputy chief of staff Dan Scavino, and former White House deputy communications director Julia Hahn.

Section 1 (42 USC § 1983) 

Section 1 of the Act, which has since been amended and codified at 42 U.S.C. § 1983 and is now known as "Section 1983", authorized monetary and injunctive relief against anyone who, acting under the authority of state law, deprived a person of their constitutional rights.
Section 1983 is the most prominent and commonly-litigated civil rights statute.

 now reads:

Section 1983 made relief—in the form of monetary damages—available to those whose constitutional rights had been violated by a person acting under State authority. Normally, constitutional rights violations are remedied by specific performance including injunctions by the courts. Thus, if a person's right to due process was violated by a prison guard who was said to be acting under the authority of the state, under § 1983, that person could bring suit for monetary damages against the prison guard. Without § 1983, that person would have to seek an injunction by the courts for the due process violation. The problem with such an action by the court is that injunctions, which instruct a party on penalty of contempt to perform or refrain from performing some action, cannot apply to past harm, only future harm. So, essentially the person would have an actionable cause—the constitutional violation—with no adequate remedy. Most § 1983 claims are brought against prison officials by prisoners, but prisoner claims are usually dismissed as being without merit. Claims can be brought by anyone stating a proper cause of action.

Circumstances changed in 1961 when the Supreme Court of the United States articulated three purposes that underlie the statute: "1) 'to override certain kinds of state laws'; 2) to provide 'a remedy where state law was inadequate'; and 3) to provide 'a federal remedy where the state remedy, though adequate in theory, was not available in practice.' " A §1983 claim requires according to the United States Supreme Court in Adickes v. S. H. Kress & Co. (1970) two elements for recovery: (1) the plaintiff must prove that the defendant has deprived him of a right secured by the, "constitution and laws," of the US, and (2) the plaintiff must show that the defendant deprived him of this constitutional right 'under color of any statute, ordinance, regulation, custom, or usage, of any State or Territory' (under color of law).

Now the statute stands as one of the most powerful authorities with which state and federal courts may protect those whose rights are deprived. Section 1983 of the 1871 Civil Rights Act provides a way individuals can sue to redress when their federally protected rights are violated, like the First Amendment rights and the Due Process Clause and the Equal Protection Clause of the Fourteenth Amendment. Section 1983 can be used to redress violated rights based on the federal Constitution and federal statutes, such as the prohibition of public sector employment discrimination based on race, color, national origin, sex, and religion.

In some jurisdictions, § 1983 has been applied directly to private employers when litigants have sued under this act. It can also be applied in virtually all jurisdictions in a more indirect manner to private employers if they are acting under state or federal authority. For example, if an additional private security company is hired by the police for an event and are given authority by the police, and, during the event, the security company violates a participant's First Amendment right, they can be sued under § 1983.

Section 2 (42 USC § 1985) 

Targeted directly at the Klan and containing some two dozen clauses, Section 2 was longer than Section 1 and received more attention from Congress during debates.
It prohibited conspiracies to overthrow the federal government, levy war against the United States, steal federal property, and a number of other acts.

Section 2 originally provided for both criminal and civil liability, but the criminal component was later found unconstitutional by the Supreme Court in the 1883 case United States v. Harris, and ultimately repealed by Congress.
The civil liability portion of Section 2 survived with amendments later codified at 42 U.S.C. § 1985, known as "Section 1985". Section 1985 authorizes lawsuits against people who conspire to commit certain prohibited acts, such as interfering with government, obstructing justice, or depriving a person of equal protection under the law.

Section 1985(1) covers conspiracies to violently prevent a public official from taking office or to "molest, interrupt, hinder, or impede" the discharge of official duties, among other acts.
Section 1985(2) addresses conspiracies to harm or threaten witnesses and jurors in federal courts, or to otherwise interfere with court proceedings, "with intent to deny to any citizen the equal protection of the laws".

In a reference to the Klan's practice of wearing face-covering hoods, Section 1985(3) prohibits two or more people from traveling in disguise or otherwise conspiring to deprive a person or class of people of equal protection of the law or other legal rights.
In addition, Section 1985(3) contains the "support-or-advocacy clauses", which cover conspiracies to harm citizens because of their support or advocacy for a federal candidate for public office.

Section 6 (42 USC § 1986) 

Section 6 of the Act, now codified at 42 U.S.C. § 1986 and known as "Section 1986", imposes civil liability upon persons who know of a violation of Section 1985 or a planned violation of Section 1985, and who are in a position to prevent it, but who fail to prevent it, fail to attempt to prevent it, or fail to assist in its prevention.
While the other sections create a remedy against conspirators who deprived people of their rights, Section 1986 creates a remedy against persons whose acquiescence make such conspiracies possible. Legislators recognized that the Klan's political violence could not continue without tacit approval from local community leaders, and sought to stop the Klan by making community leaders financially responsible for terrorist acts they knowingly fail to prevent. This section of the Act has been rarely invoked since its enactment, but is used to combat terrorism in modern times by providing a "disincentive to those who would protect or foster conspiratorial terrorist acts".

Other provisions 

Section 3 authorized the president to use the military to suppress domestic violence and conspiracies to deprive people of their constitutional rights.

Section 4 authorized the president to suspend the writ of habeas corpus to suppress a rebellion.
This section expired after one year.

Section 5 barred persons violating the Act from sitting as jurors in any proceeding under the Act, and imposed an oath upon jurors not to violate the Act.

Section 7 provided, "nothing herein contained shall be construed to supersede or repeal any former act or law except so far as the same may be repugnant thereto", and that prosecutions "shall be continued and completed, the same as if this act had not been passed, except so far as the provisions of this act may go to sustain and validate such proceedings".

Jurisprudence
Although some provisions were ruled unconstitutional in 1883, the 1870 Force Act and the 1871 Civil Rights Act have been invoked in later civil rights conflicts, including the 1964 murders of Chaney, Goodman, and Schwerner; the 1965 murder of Viola Liuzzo; and in Bray v. Alexandria Women's Health Clinic, 506 U.S. 263 (1993), in which the court ruled that "The first clause of 1985(3) does not provide a federal cause of action against persons obstructing access to abortion clinics."

It was also used in the 1969 case of Tinker v. Des Moines. By the time Beth Tinker was in school, the law had expanded to make school boards liable if they stood in the way of people's federally protected rights.

Today, the 1871 Civil Rights Act can be invoked whenever a state actor violates a federally guaranteed right. The most common use today is to redress violations of the Fourth Amendment's protection against unreasonable search and seizure. Such lawsuits concern false arrest and police brutality, most notably in the Rodney King case. The rise of the Black Lives Matter movement along with smart phone video cameras have made Section 1983 lawsuits easier to obtain because of technological advances, including bodycams worn by law enforcement.

The Act was invoked in the 2010 Robbins v. Lower Merion School District case, where plaintiffs charged two suburban Philadelphia high schools secretly spied on students by surreptitiously and remotely activating webcams embedded in school-issued laptops the students were using at home, violating their right to privacy. The schools admitted to snapping over 66,000 webshots and screenshots secretly, including webcam shots of students in their bedrooms.

The 2019 Supreme Court case Nieves v. Bartlett ruled that in general when probable cause for an arrest exists it overrides a First Amendment retaliatory arrest claim arising under section 1983, but that there are some narrow exceptions to this. Because officers can exercise their discretion in making arrests for warrantless misdemeanor crimes, a plaintiff can succeed on a section 1983 claim if they can present objective evidence that other similarly situated individuals who were not engaged in protected speech had not been arrested.

Also in 2019, the Court held that the 3-year statute of limitations for a fabrication of evidence civil lawsuit under section 1983 of the Civil Rights Act begins to run when the criminal case ends in the plaintiff's favor.

In June 2020 the United States Court of Appeals for the Fourth Circuit rejected qualified immunity for five Police officers in West Virginia who had kicked, beaten, tased, and finally killed Wayne A. Jones, by shooting him 22 times.

On February 16, 2021, the Act was asserted in an action in the District Court, D.C., by Rep. Bennie G. Thompson (D, MS2), chair of the House Homeland Security Committee (in his personal capacity) against former President Donald Trump (in his personal capacity), Trump's attorney Rudolph Giuliani and (far-right "militia" groups) Proud Boys and Oath Keepers.

The Thompson v. Trump., et al. case was followed by a subsequent action filed August 26, 2021, by seven Capitol Police officers, reportedly against the same defendants.

See also
 Antebellum South Carolina
 Kirk–Holden War, an 1870 struggle against the Klan in North Carolina

References

Works cited 

 (PDF)

 (PDF)
 (PDF)
 (PDF)
 (PDF)

External links

Full text of the Enforcement of 1871 (simplified version)
Text of Enforcement Act of 1871 as codified- 42 U.S. Code 21 §§1983, 1988
 18 U.S.C. § 242 is "the criminal analog of 1983."

1871 in American law
Anti-discrimination law in the United States
History of African-American civil rights
Reconstruction Era legislation
Civil Rights Acts
United States federal criminal legislation
United States federal sovereign immunity case law
42nd United States Congress

Ku Klux Klan
Political crimes